Scale the Summit is an American instrumental progressive metal band from Houston, Texas. Their discography consists of seven studio albums, one compilation album, twenty singles, six music videos and one demo.

Scale the Summit was formed in 2004 by guitarist Chris Letchford and some classmates from the Los Angeles Musicians Institute. Their debut album, Monument, was self-funded and self-released, but the group signed to Prosthetic Records in time to release their second album, Carving Desert Canyons.

After the release of The Collective, the group's third album and last to feature their original line-up, the band finally headlined their own tour in 2012, having been a supporting act on all tours up to that point. The following year, the band released the fourth album The Migration, the first to feature a new member in place of an original member, and two years later another original member left before the release of their fifth album V.

Albums

Studio albums

Compilation albums

Demo albums

Singles

Music videos

References

External links
 Scale the Summit discography at Discogs

Discographies of American artists
Heavy metal group discographies